"Bad Friend" is a song by Japanese-British singer-songwriter Rina Sawayama, released on 15 April 2020 as the fifth single from her debut studio album Sawayama, just two days before the album's release. A remix by End of the World was released on 20 November 2020. Sawayama has called the track her favourite from the album and stated that it was written after she found out through social media that her formerly close friend had just had a baby.

Composition
The synth-pop ballad is inspired by "Bush-era pop" with vocal manipulation inspired by Imogen Heap. Channelling "the same heart-on-sleeve emotion as Stripped-era Christina Aguilera" the song features a choral bridge described as a "take 'em to church moment". The song indirectly references Carly Rae Jepsen's 2012 hit single "Call Me Maybe" when she sings about "Singing our hearts out to Carly" in the summer of 2012. According to Sawayama, "Bad Friend" is about a deteriorating friendship during a trip to Tokyo and "how Westerners come to Tokyo and have a great time but can be very disrespectful to Japanese people". This ties the song in with the rest of the album's themes of family and cultural identity.

Critical reception
Pitchfork placed the song at number 38 on their list of 100 best songs of 2020, with Dani Blum writing that on "Bad Friend", "Sawayama gives friend breakups their own ballad" while a "sense of shame courses through the track, undercutting her excuses". Blum felt that "relief doesn't come easy, but once it does, the song softens and shines". Elton John characterized "Bad Friend" as a "song that Madonna would die for", while simultaneously dubbing its parent album as the "strongest album of the year by far".

Music video
The "Bad Friend" official music video was released in May 2020. The film noir-inspired visual was directed by Ali Kurr stars Sawayama in drag as an older Japanese businessman drowning his sorrows in a bar. There he meets another man who he befriends, but later ends up fighting.

Track listing
Digital download
"Bad Friend" – 3:28

Digital download – End of the World remix
"Bad Friend" (End of the World Remix) – 3:15

References 

Rina Sawayama songs
2020 songs
2020 singles
Dirty Hit singles
Synth-pop ballads
Songs written by Jonny Lattimer
Songs written by Rina Sawayama